The Copyright Alliance is a nonprofit, nonpartisan 501(c)(4) organization representing artistic creators across a broad range of copyright disciplines.

The Copyright Alliance's institutional members include more than sixty trade organizations, associations, unions, companies, and guilds, that represent millions of individual creators. The Copyright Alliance also directly collaborates with and represents more than twenty three thousand creative individuals and small businesses. The creative industries represented include writers, composers, recording artists, journalists, documentarians, filmmakers, graphic artists, visual artists, photographers, authors, software developers, and numerous other genres.

History

At its launch in May 2007, the Copyright Alliance was founded by four Board members, the American Society of Composers, Authors and Publishers, Broadcast Music, Inc., the Motion Picture Association of America (now called Motion Picture Association), and Universal. It was initially created and masterminded by President and CEO of the Motion Picture Association Jack Valenti. Music artists Steve Cropper and Lamont Dozier attended the launch, which included a membership of 29 organizations that represented 11 million creative workers, including the Association of American Publishers, Microsoft, the Recording Industry Association of America (RIAA), Viacom, and Disney.

The launch of the Copyright Alliance was supported by U.S. House of Representatives Judiciary Committee Chairman John Conyers (D-MI), Ranking Representative Howard Coble (R-NC), Representative Howard Berman (D-CA), and members of the United States House Judiciary Subcommittee on Intellectual Property, Competition, and the Internet. In speaking of being inspired by the late Jack Valenti, Representative Berman noted that "the constant assaults on copyright law" resulted in the Copyright Alliance’s origin, and he called the organization’s launch "a tremendous idea.” 

The Copyright Alliance was launched in opposition to the Digital Freedom Campaign, formed the previous October, whose members include the Consumer Electronics Association, Public Knowledge, and the Electronic Freedom Foundation.

Patrick Ross served as executive director of the Copyright Alliance for four years until he was succeeded by Sandra Aistars on December 20, 2010. Prior to taking the position, Aistars was Vice President and Associate General Counsel at Time Warner. On September 15, 2015, it was announced that Keith Kupferschmid would succeed Sandra Aistars as CEO of the Copyright Alliance. Kupferschmid previously served as General Counsel and Senior Vice President for Intellectual Property at the Software and Information Industry Association (SIIA).

Members
As of March 2022, the Copyright Alliance lists 60 organizations as organization members.

 Trade associations

American Association of Independent Music
Association of American Publishers
Association of Independent Music Publishers
Church Music Publisher's Association
Entertainment Software Association
Global Music Rights
Independent Book Publishers Association
Motion Picture Association
Association of Magazine Media
Music Arts Coalition
Music Creators North America
Nashville Songwriters Association International
National Association of Broadcasters
National Association of Realtors
National Fire Protection Association
National Music Publishers' Association
News Media Alliance
North American Nature Photography Association
Picture Licensing Universal System
Professional Photographers of America
Recording Industry Association of America
Society of Composers & Lyricists
Software and Information Industry Association
Songwriters of North America

 Trade unions

American Intellectual Property Law Association
American Photographic Artists
American Society for Collective Rights Licensing
American Society of Media Photographers
Authors Guild
Copyright Clearance Center
Directors Guild of America
Digital Media Licensing Association
Graphic Artists Guild
International Alliance of Theatrical Stage Employees
National Press Photographers Association
Recording Academy
Screen Actors Guild—American Federation of Television and Radio Artists

 Copyright collection societies

American Society of Composers, Authors and Publishers
Artists Rights Society
BMI
SESAC
SoundExchange
 Media companies

 
Disney
Getty Images
NBCUniversal
Netflix
NewsCorp
RELX
Sony Pictures
Warner Bros. Discovery
Thomson Reuters
Universal Music Group
ViacomCBS

 Tech companies

Adobe
Oracle
 Sports organizations

National Basketball Association
National Football League
Ultimate Fighting Championship

Apparel

 Nike

Activities

In 2009, the organization presented a letter to the White House asking it to pursue policies supportive of artists' rights signed by 11,000 artists and creators. Over the years, the Copyright Alliance has collaborated with various groups. In 2014, it helped the US Copyright Office present its 2014 World IP Day program That same year, it also hosted a briefing on Capitol Hill with the Creative Rights Caucus to "discuss the challenges photographers and visual artists face in the internet age." The organization also has worked with groups such as Google, Yahoo, and Public Knowledge to develop voluntary best practices for addressing online copyright infringement.

Advocacy

The Copyright Alliance filed briefs in Allen v. Cooper, which was decided in 2020: the Supreme Court of the United States abrogated the Copyright Remedy Clarification Act as unconstitutional, the Copyright Alliance had argued the opposite view.

Political issues

The group supported an IP-PRO bill establishing a "copyright czar" in June 2008 Senate Judiciary Committee hearings. The PRO-IP bill was introduced in the Senate shortly thereafter and passed into law. Ars Technica called the bill a victory for "Big Content," though a provision for the Department of Justice to join suits for the benefit of copyright holders was stripped from the bill.

On November 16, 2009, the Copyright Alliance was joined by some of its independent creator members in hand-delivering a letter to the White House signed by more than 11,000 artists and creators, calling on President Barack Obama and Vice President Joe Biden to defend the rights of artists and creators.

In May 2009, it launched the Creators Across America campaign, which includes videos of artists and creators across the United States speaking about their arts and their rights under copyright law.

The Copyright Alliance received $600,000 from the Motion Picture Association in 2012, which that year had also donated $475,000 to the Center for Copyright Information and $100,000 each to the Democratic Governors Association and Republican Governors Association as part of an anti-piracy campaign.

The Copyright Alliance also supports the Music Modernization Act (MMA), which was entered into law in 2018; and the Copyright Alternative in Small-Claims Enforcement Act of 2019 (the CASE Act).

See also

Copyleft
Creative Commons
Fair use
Free-culture movement
Intellectual property
Copyright Remedy Clarification Act

References

External links
 

Copyright law organizations
501(c)(4) nonprofit organizations